Brittany Jack (born ) is an Australian female volleyball player. She is part of the Australia women's national volleyball team.

She participated in the 2015 FIVB Volleyball World Grand Prix.
On club level she played for UTSSU in 2015.

References

1994 births
Living people
Australian women's volleyball players
Place of birth missing (living people)